Vugrovec is a rural suburb of Zagreb, Croatia. It is composed of three settlements: Gornji Vugrovec, Donji Vugrovec and Vuger Selo. According to the 2011 census, the population of Donji Vugrovec is 442 people, Gornji Vugrovec is inhabited by 357 people, while Vuger Selo is home to 273 inhabitants. Vugrovec lent its name to the Vuger stream, whose source lies nearby.

References

Populated places in the City of Zagreb